Frederick Wadsworth Loring (December 12, 1848 – November 5, 1871) was an American journalist, novelist and poet.

Loring was born on December 12, 1848, in Boston, Massachusetts, to David and Mary Hall Stodder Loring. He was a fifth great grandson to immigrant Thomas Loring. He graduated from Phillips Academy, Andover, in 1866, and then from Harvard University, where he first made his mark with contributions to the Harvard Advocate, in 1870. Inheriting a love of literature from his mother, who died when he was eleven, he quickly gained in stature as an up-and-coming American author. In 1871, he published a novel, Two College Friends, and a book of poems, The Boston Dip and Other Verses. Two College Friends, in which two Harvard students serve together in the Civil War, has been singled out as an important example of the representation of romantic male friendship. He also made numerous contributions, both fiction and non-fiction, to such periodicals as  The Atlantic Monthly, Appleton's Journal, Old and New, The Independent, and Every Saturday during this time.

Wickenburg Massacre 

In the spring of 1871, Appleton's Journal sent Loring as a correspondent on a cartographic expedition to Arizona led by Lieutenant George M. Wheeler of the US Army Corps of Engineers. The articles Loring wrote included "A Council of War," "A Glimpse of Mormonism," "Silver Mining in Nevada," and "The Valley of Death." Their party suffered several setbacks, and in August 1871 Loring wrote to his employers from Death Valley: "I am bootless, coatless, everything but lifeless. I have had a fortnight of horrors. This morning an Indian fight capped the climax. However, I am well and cheerful." Although they escaped from the valley, his party's carriage was attacked on November 5 by a band of Yavapai near Wickenburg, Arizona, while on the way to La Paz. That ambush came to be known as the Wickenburg Massacre. The driver, Loring, and four other passengers were killed.

After his death, he was mourned by Charles Reade as the most promising of all young American authors.

Several of Loring's poems, including "In the Old Churchyard at Fredericksburg" and "The Old Professor", have appeared in American verse anthologies.

Bibliography 
 Cotton Cultivation in the South (1869, with Charles F. Atkinson)
 Two College Friends (1871)
 The Boston Dip and Other Verses (1871)

References 

19th-century American poets
19th-century American novelists
American male novelists
1848 births
1871 deaths
American male poets
19th-century American journalists
American male journalists
19th-century American male writers
Murdered American journalists
People murdered in Arizona
Novelists from Massachusetts
Harvard Advocate alumni